Isopropylmagnesium chloride is an organometallic compound with the general formula (CH3)2HCMgCl. This highly flammable, colorless, and  moisture sensitive material is the Grignard reagent derived from isopropyl chloride.  It is commercially available, usually as a solution in tetrahydrofuran. This reagent is used to prepare Grignard reagents by transmetalation reactions as well as installing isopropyl groups.  An illustrative generic reaction involves the generation of the Grignard reagent derived from bromo-3,5-bis(trifluoromethyl)benzene:
(CH3)2HCMgCl  +  (CF3)2C6H3Br  →  (CH3)2HCCl  +  (CF3)2C6H3MgBr

Isopropylmagnesium chloride is also used to prepare other isopropyl compounds, such as chlorodiisopropylphosphine:
PCl3  +  2 (CH3)2CHMgCl   →   [(CH3)2CH]2PCl  +  2 MgCl2
This reaction exploits the bulky nature of the isopropyl substituent.

References

Organomagnesium compounds